In Our Lifetime is the third album by trumpeter Dave Douglas. It was released on the New World label in 1995 and features performances by Douglas, Josh Roseman, Chris Speed, Marty Ehrlich, Uri Caine, James Genus and Joey Baron. The album features Douglas' interpretations of three compositions by Booker Little and nine of his originals.

Reception
The Allmusic review by Scott Yanow states "Trumpeter Dave Douglas's New World CD is consistently intriguing, the type of music that gains in interest with each listening".

Track listing
 "In Our Lifetime" - 10:16  
 "Three Little Monsters" - 5:20  
 "Forward Flight" (Little) - 6:54  
 "The Persistence of Memory" - 4:37  
 "Out in the Cold" - 6:26  
 "Strength and Sanity" (Little) - 4:47  
 "Sappho" - 0:49  
 "At Dawn" - 4:07  
 "Shred" - 2:41  
 "Rapid Ear Movement" - 1:36  
 "Moods in Free Time" (Little) - 5:40  
 "Bridges (For Tim Berne)" - 17:44
All compositions by Dave Douglas except as indicated

Personnel
Dave Douglas: trumpet
Josh Roseman: trombone
Chris Speed: clarinet, tenor saxophone
Uri Caine: piano
James Genus: bass
Joey Baron: drums
Marty Ehrlich: bass clarinet (track 1)

References

1995 albums
Dave Douglas (trumpeter) albums